The Sister Dominica Manor, originally known as Bradford House, is a high-rise building located in the Federal Hill district of Providence, Rhode Island. The Sister Domininca Manor has 16 floors, and was completed in 1966.

The Sister Dominica Manor was constructed as the tallest of three low-income elderly housing projects built by Rhode Island Housing and the city of Providence in the 1960s. It was the tallest all-residential building in Providence until late 2007, when the Waterplace Towers were completed.

References

External links

Residential buildings completed in 1966
Residential skyscrapers in Providence, Rhode Island
1966 establishments in Rhode Island
Federal Hill, Providence, Rhode Island